Brachydesmiella obclavata is a fungus first found in decaying pods of unidentified Leguminosae in Bahia State, Brazil. The species is distinguished by obclavate, rostrate, 1-euseptate, pale brown, smooth-walled conidia.

References

Further reading
Grandi, Rosely A. Piccolo, and Thacyana de Valois Silva. "Hyphomycetes sobre folhas em decomposição de Caesalpinia echinata Lam.: ocorrências novas para o Brasil." Revista Brasileira de Botânica 26.4 (2003): 489–493.
Marques, Marcos Fabio Oliveira, et al. "Cryptophiale and Cryptophialoidea (conidial fungi) from Brazil and keys to the genera." Brazilian Journal of Botany31.2 (2008): 339–344.
Fabio Oliveira Marques, Marcos, and Leonor Orientador Costa Maia. "Fungos conidiais associados à decomposição de substratos vegetais em fragmento de Mata Atlântica, Serra da Jibóia, Bahia." (2007).
Morris, Everett F. "Costa Rican Hyphomycetes." Mycologia (1972): 887–896.

External links

MycoCank

Ascomycota enigmatic taxa